Ruşen Eşref Ünaydın (1892–1959) was a Turkish linguist, politician, journalist, diplomat, writer and author. He was a member of the commission involved in introducing the modern Turkish alphabet. He was the first general secretary of the Turkish Language Association (1933). He was appointed ambassador to Albania (1934), Hungary (1939–1943), Italy (1943–1944), the United Kingdom (1944–1945), and Greece (1945–1952).

Ünaydın was a pioneer in Turkish literature and journalism for the interviews he published in 1917 and 1918. These were hailed as the first modern features appeared in Turkish newspapers, and were later published as a book entitled "Diyorlar Ki" (Thus They Said).

References

1892 births
1959 deaths
Writers from Istanbul
20th-century journalists
20th-century Turkish writers
Turkish journalists
Diplomats from Istanbul
Ambassadors of Turkey to the United Kingdom
Ambassadors of Turkey to Albania
Ambassadors of Turkey to Hungary
Ambassadors of Turkey to Italy
Ambassadors of Turkey to Greece
Burials at Aşiyan Asri Cemetery